The Diocese of San Juan de Calama is a diocese located in the city of Calama in the Ecclesiastical province of Antofagasta in Chile.

History
 21 July 1965: Established as the Territorial Prelature of Calama from Diocese of Antofagasta and Diocese of Iquique
 20 February 2010: Promoted as Diocese of San Juan de Calama

Leadership, in reverse chronological order
 Bishops of San Juan Bautista de Calama (Roman rite), below
 Bishop Óscar Hernán Blanco Martínez (2016.03.21 – 2022.07.13), appointed Bishop of Punta Arenas
 Bishop Guillermo Patricio Vera Soto (2010.02.20 – 2014.02.22), appointed Bishop of Iquique
 Territorial Prelates of Calama (Roman rite), below
 Bishop Guillermo Patricio Vera Soto (2003.04.10 – 2010.02.20)
 Bishop Cristián Contreras Molina, O. de M. (1992.06.11 – 2002.07.19), appointed Bishop of San Felipe
 Bishop Juan Bautista Herrada Armijo, O. de M. (1982.03.05 – 1991.11.30)
 Bishop Juan Bautista Herrada Armijo, O. de M. (Apostolic Administrator 1976.02.26 – 1982.03.05)
 Archbishop Carlos Oviedo Cavada, O. de M. (Apostolic Administrator 1974–1976); future Cardinal
 Bishop Juan Luis Ysern de Arce (Apostolic Administrator 1972.05.20 – 1974.06.02)
 Archbishop Francisco de Borja Valenzuela Ríos (Apostolic Administrator 1970.04 – 1970.06.02)
 Bishop Orozimbo Fuenzalida y Fuenzalida (1968.03.13 – 1970.02.26), appointed Bishop of Los Angeles
 Archbishop Francisco de Borja Valenzuela Ríos (Apostolic Administrator 1965.07.21 – 1968.05.19)

Sources
 GCatholic.org
 Catholic Hierarchy
 Diocese website

Roman Catholic dioceses in Chile
Christian organizations established in 1965
Roman Catholic dioceses and prelatures established in the 20th century
Calama, Territorial Prelature of
1965 establishments in Chile